Mohammad-Jafar Salmasi (22 September 1918 – 31 January 2000) was an Iranian weightlifter who won Iran's first Olympic medal at 1948 Summer Olympics.

Early life
Jafar Salmasi was born in Kadhimiya, Iraq but was originally from Salmas in northwestern Iran. Before he began his career as a weightlifter, he was a teacher at an Iranian school in Baghdad. An accomplished athlete, he taught himself gymnastics moves by reading illustrated books.

He discovered weightlifting in his late 20s during a trip to Tehran, and later was asked by the Iranian government to compete in a national weightlifting tournament.  He won, and in 1948 went to London to compete for Iran's first Olympic team.

International weightlifting career
On 7 July 1948, he won the bronze medal in the 56 – 60 kg featherweight event.

He was the Iranian champion in the featherweight weight class for five years, 1944 through 1948.

Salmasi returned to Baghdad after the Olympics. Later, won the gold medal at the 1951 Asian Games in New Delhi.

Later life
Later, Salmasi trained Iraqi weightlifters and continued teaching Iranian students there. When Saddam Hussein took power, Salmasi left Iraq and moved to Iran with his family.

He died in Tehran in January, 2000.

References 

 Biography
 www.chidlovski.net
 Jafar Salmasi's profile at Sports Reference.com

1918 births
2000 deaths
Iranian male weightlifters
Iranian strength athletes
Weightlifters at the 1948 Summer Olympics
Olympic weightlifters of Iran
Olympic bronze medalists for Iran
Asian Games gold medalists for Iran
Olympic medalists in weightlifting
Asian Games medalists in weightlifting
Weightlifters at the 1951 Asian Games
Medalists at the 1948 Summer Olympics
Medalists at the 1951 Asian Games
20th-century Iranian people
People from Salmas